The 1999 ATP Tour World Championships (also known for the doubles event as the Phoenix ATP Tour World Doubles Championship for sponsorship reasons) was a tennis tournament played on indoor carpet courts. The surface was called "GreenSet On Wood" which had a wood base coated in synthetic material and provided a medium-pace surface. It was the 30th edition of the year-end singles championships, the 26th edition of the year-end doubles championships, and both were part of the 1999 ATP Tour. The singles event took place at the EXPO 2000 Tennis Dome in Hanover, Germany, from November 23 through November 28, 1999, and the doubles event at the Hartford Civic Center in Hartford, Connecticut, United States, from 17 November through 21 November 1999.

Champions

Singles

 Pete Sampras defeated  Andre Agassi, 6–1, 7–5, 6–4
It was Pete Sampras' 5th title of the year, and his 60th overall. It was his 5th and last year-end championships title.

Doubles

 Sébastien Lareau /  Alex O'Brien defeated  Mahesh Bhupathi /  Leander Paes, 6–3, 6–2, 6–2

See also
 Agassi–Sampras rivalry

References

External links
Official website
Singles Finals Draw
Singles round robin draw (White Group)
Singles round robin draw (Red Group)
Doubles Finals Draw
Doubles round robin draw (Gold Group)
Doubles round robin draw (Green Group)

 
ATP Tour World Championships
1999
Tennis tournaments in Germany
Tennis tournaments in the United States
1999 in German tennis
1999 in American tennis
Sport in Hanover
Sports in Hartford, Connecticut
Sports competitions in Hartford, Connecticut
1999 in sports in Connecticut